The 2014 Australian Drivers' Championship was a CAMS sanctioned Australian motor racing title, the winner of which was awarded the 2014 CAMS Gold Star. It was the 58th Australian Drivers' Championship and the tenth to be contested with open wheel racing cars constructed in accordance with FIA Formula 3 regulations. The championship began on 27 February at the Adelaide Parklands Circuit and ended on 2 November at Sydney Motorsport Park after seven rounds across five different states and territories. Formula 3 Management Pty Ltd was appointed by CAMS as the Category Manager for the Championship. The championship was promoted as the 2014 Formula 3 Australian Drivers' Championship with the winner awarded the 58th Australian Drivers' Championship and the 14th Australian Formula 3 Championship.

The championship was won by Simon Hodge, driving a Mygale M11 Mercedes-Benz for Team BRM.

Race calendar

The championship was contested over a seven-round series. 

Note: 
 The results for each round of the Championship were determined by the results of the final race at that round.
 The Kumho Cup was contested only at Rounds 2, 3 and 7.

Teams and drivers
The following teams and drivers contested the 2014 Australian Drivers' Championship.

Note: All chassis constructed between 1 January 2008 and 31 December 2011 were required to be fitted with a HWA Mercedes-Benz series M271 ‘Australian control engine’.

Classes
Competing cars were nominated into one of four classes:
 Australian Formula 3 Championship – for automobiles constructed in accordance with the FIA Formula 3 regulations that applied in the year of manufacture between 1 January 2005 and 31 December 2011.
 National Class – for automobiles constructed in accordance with the FIA Formula 3 regulations that applied in the year of manufacture between 1 January 1999 and 31 December 2007.
 Kumho Cup Class – for automobiles constructed in accordance with the FIA Formula 3 regulations that applied in the year of manufacture between 1 January 1999 and 31 December 2004.
 Invitational Class.

Points system
Championship points were awarded in each class as follows:
 One point was awarded to the driver placed in the highest grid position in each class for the first race at each round.
 20–15–12–10–8–6–4–3–2–1 for the first ten finishing positions in each class in each race of a round which comprised two races.
 12–9–8–7–6–5–4–3–2–1 for the first ten finishing positions in each class in each of the first two races of a round which comprised three races.
 20–15–12–10–8–6–4–3–2–1 basis for the first ten finishing positions in each class in the third race of a round which comprised three races.
 One point was awarded to the driver setting the fastest lap time in each class in each race.

Championship standings

See also
 Australian Drivers' Championship
 Australian Formula 3

References

External links
 
 Online race results at www.natsoft.com.au

Australian Drivers' Championship
Drivers' Championship
Australian Formula 3 seasons
Australia
Australian Formula 3